Michael Olaha (born 4 July 1996) is a Nigerian professional footballer who plays as a forward for V.League 1 club Sông Lam Nghệ An.

Club career
Olaha signed for Nigerian Premier League side Abia Warriors in 2015 from the New Generation Academy. After impressing in his first season, he was offered a trial with Slovenian side NK Domžale.

He signed with Vietnamese side Sông Lam Nghệ An in January 2017.

After two and a half years he left Song Lam and signed for Israeli Premier League club, Hapoel Tel Aviv, for four years.

On 23 July 2020, he moved on loan to Hapoel Kfar Shalem.

References

External links
 

1996 births
Living people
Sportspeople from Lagos
Nigerian footballers
Association football forwards
Abia Warriors F.C. players
Song Lam Nghe An FC players
Hapoel Tel Aviv F.C. players
Hapoel Kfar Shalem F.C. players
Nigeria Professional Football League players
V.League 1 players
Israeli Premier League players
Liga Leumit players
Nigerian expatriate footballers
Expatriate footballers in Vietnam
Expatriate footballers in Israel
Nigerian expatriate sportspeople in Vietnam
Nigerian expatriate sportspeople in Israel